Rosenlundshallen was Sweden's first ice hockey arena and was located in Jönköping.

The arena was HV71's home arena until 2000 when it was replaced by Husqvarna Garden. It opened in 1958 and held 4,500 people during sport events.

References

External links 
 Pictures of arena

Indoor arenas in Sweden
Indoor ice hockey venues in Sweden
HV71
Defunct indoor arenas
Former ice hockey venues in Sweden
Sports venues in Jönköping
Sports venues completed in 1958
1958 establishments in Sweden